Sitapur Cutchery railway station is a small railway station in Sitapur district, Uttar Pradesh. Its code is STRK. It serves Sitapur city. The station consists of a single platform. The platform is not well sheltered. It lacks many facilities including water and sanitation.

References

Railway stations in Sitapur district
Lucknow NER railway division
Sitapur